Jekyll may refer to:

Entertainment

Film
 The Two Faces of Dr. Jekyll, a 1960 horror film
 Dr. Jekyll y el Hombre Lobo, a 1972 Spanish horror film
 Jekyll, a 2007 horror film

Television
 Jekyll (TV series), a 2007 BBC television series
 Jekyll & Hyde (TV series), a 2015 ITV television series

Theatre
 Jekyll & Hyde (musical), a 1997 Broadway musical

Music

Albums
 Jekyll, a 2013 re-release of Hyde (EP) by South Korean boy band VIXX

Songs
 "Jekyll", a song by Exo on the album Obsession

Places
 Jekyll Island, an island off the coast of the U.S. state of Georgia
 Jekyll Island Club, private club located thereon

Other uses
 Jekyll (software), a static blogging platform
 Jekyll (surname)

See also
 Dr. Jekyll and Mr. Hyde (disambiguation)